Cuando los hijos odian ("When the Children Hate") is a 1950 Mexican film. It stars Carlos Orellana.

Cast 
 Carlos Orellana - Tachito
 Amanda del Llano - Lolita
 Eduardo Noriega - José Luis Durán
 Fernando Soto - Stoperol, Ceferino Sánchez
 Delia Magaña - Nicolasa
 Miguel Inclán - Ramón González
 Gloria Iturbe - Mamá de José Luis
 Lupe Inclán - Doña Carmelita
 Alfonso Iglesias Padre - Compadre de Ramón 
 Salvador Lozano - Doctor Aceves
 Antonio R. Frausto - Fortino

External links
 

1950 films
1950s Spanish-language films
Mexican comedy-drama films
1950 comedy-drama films
Mexican black-and-white films
1950s Mexican films